Pål Trøan Aune (born 29 March 1992) is a Norwegian cross-country skier.

He made his World Cup debut in December 2013 in Asiago, a sprint race. Competing in nothing but sprint, he collected his first World Cup points with a 20th place in February 2015 in Östersund. He improved to a ninth place in December 2017 in Lillehammer, seventh in January 2018 in Dresden, sixth in March 2019 in Drammen and fourth in January 2020 in Dresden.

He represents the sports club Steinkjer SK.

Cross-country skiing results
All results are sourced from the International Ski Federation (FIS).

World Cup

Season standings

References 

1992 births
Living people
People from Steinkjer
Norwegian male cross-country skiers
Sportspeople from Trøndelag